Cox's Bazar-2 is a constituency represented in the Jatiya Sangsad (National Parliament) of Bangladesh since 2014 by Asheq Ullah Rafiq of the Awami League.

Boundaries 
The constituency encompasses Kutubdia and Maheshkhali upazilas.

History 
The constituency was created in 1984 from a Chittagong constituency when the former Chittagong District was split into two districts: Chittagong and Cox's Bazar.

Members of Parliament

Elections

Elections in the 2010s 
Asheq Ullah Rafiq was elected unopposed in the 2014 general election after opposition parties withdrew their candidacies in a boycott of the election.

Elections in the 2000s

Elections in the 1990s

References

External links
 

Parliamentary constituencies in Bangladesh
Cox's Bazar District